Shizi Township is a mountain indigenous township in Pingtung County, Taiwan.  It is the largest township of the county. The main population is the Paiwan people of the Taiwanese aborigines.

Names
The original Paiwan name for the area was Tjakuvukuvulj (Tjakuvukuvuɬ; historically rendered as Chaobo Obol or in ). Han Chinese settlers noted a rock outcropping in the shape of a lion's head and called the village Sai-a-thau-sia.

Under Kuomintang rule, the name was changed to the current Shizi, though in Taiwanese Hokkien the name Sai-a-thau is still normally used in spoken contexts.

Geography
The terrain of Shizi is mountainous, as the district is located near Taiwan's Central Mountain Range.

Administrative divisions
The township comprises eight villages:
 Caopu (Paiwan: Supaw)
 Danlu (Paiwan: Tjakuljakuljai)
 Fenglin(Paiwan: Kaidi/Naimalipa)
 Nanshi (Paiwan: Nansiku/Tjuladu)
 Neishi (Paiwan: Kacedas)
 Neiwen (Paiwan: Naibun/Tjakuvukuvulj)
 Shizi (Paiwan: Tjaqaciljai)
 Zhukeng (Paiwan: Tjuruguai)

Economy

Agriculture
Agriculture produced in the township includes mangoes, bird's-nest ferns and watermelons.

Tourist attractions
Places of interest in or around Shizi are Shuangliu Forest Recreation Area, the Cultural Objects Museum, Lilongshan and Neiwen Village.

Transportation

Shizi is connected via railway through the TRA South-Link Line. A key station is Fangshan Station. Two highways run through the township: Provincial Highway No.1 and Provincial Highway No.9 (South-Link Highway).

References

External links

Shizi Township Office website 

Townships in Pingtung County